The following elections occurred in the year 1906.

Asia 
 1906 Persian legislative election

Europe
 1906 Belgian general election
 1906 Croatian parliamentary election
 Denmark
 1906 Danish Folketing election
 1906 Danish Landsting election
 1906 Danish local elections
 1906 Faroese general election
 1906 Greek legislative election
 1906 Hungarian parliamentary election
 1906 Liechtenstein general election
 1906 Montenegrin parliamentary election
 1906 Norwegian parliamentary election
 Portugal
 April 1906 Portuguese legislative election
 August 1906 Portuguese legislative election
 1906 Russian legislative election

United Kingdom
 1906 United Kingdom general election
 List of MPs elected in the 1906 United Kingdom general election
 1906 Bodmin by-election
 February 1906 City of London by-election
 1906 Cockermouth by-election
 1906 Dulwich by-election

North America

Canada
 1906 Edmonton municipal election
 1906 Nova Scotia general election

United States
 United States House of Representatives elections in California, 1906
 1906 California gubernatorial election
 1906 New York state election
 United States House of Representatives elections in South Carolina, 1906
 1906 South Carolina gubernatorial election
 1906 United States House of Representatives elections
 1906 and 1907 United States Senate elections
 United States Senate election in Massachusetts, 1907

South America
 1906 Brazilian presidential election
 1906 Chilean presidential election

Oceania

Australia
 1906 Australian federal election
 1906 Australian referendum
 1906 South Australian state election

New Zealand
 1906 Manukau by-election
 1906 Westland by-election

See also
 :Category:1906 elections

1906
Elections